Anarchists Against the Wall (AAtW), sometimes called "Anarchists Against Fences" or "Jews Against Ghettos", is a direct action group composed of Israeli anarchists and anti-authoritarians who oppose the construction of the Israeli Gaza Strip barrier and Israeli West Bank barrier.

A member of Anarchists Against the Wall has described the construction of the barrier as part of a strategy of ethnic cleansing, "one of the greatest threats the Palestinian population has known over the last century... which is to make life so appalling for the Palestinian people that they will be left with one choice: move out."

History

On 26 December 2003, during an AATW demonstration near the village of Mas'ha, the Israeli Defense Forces shot and wounded Gil Na'amati, an anarchist and former paratrooper. Shots were fired after demonstrators started to shake the locked gate in the fence. Video clips of that incident were shown on all Israeli TV channels.

On 12 March 2004, during a demonstration against the Wall at the village of Kharbatha, Itay Levinsky was shot in the eye with a rubber bullet.

On April 3 Jonathan Pollak was shot in the head with a tear gas canister from an M16, at a distance of approximately thirty meters, at a protest against the Wall in the West Bank village of Bil'in, leaving him with internal brain hemorrhaging and a wound requiring 23 stitches.

In February 2006, Matan Cohen, a 17-year-old member of Anarchists Against The Wall, was shot with rubber bullets by Israeli soldiers during a demonstration in Beit Sira village. Cohen, whose left eye was injured, later told reporters, "My feeling is that the blood of left-wing activists and the Palestinians is cheap." Three soldiers and Border Police officers were injured by rocks thrown at them, and one police officer was taken to hospital.

On August 11, in the midst of the 2006 war in Lebanon, marked the most severe injury to an Israeli activist yet. During a demonstration against the wall in Bil'in, an Israeli border police officer shot Limor Goldstein in the head with a rubber coated steel bullet from a distance of 10 to 20 meters. Shooting rubber bullets from such a short distance is prohibited and video evidence indicates that the shot was unprovoked. With border police officers at the scene initially refusing to provide medical treatment to his injury, or let others treat him properly, it took two hours to complete the evacuation.

Goldstein, who suffered brain damage, later told a Haaretz reporter: "I'm not depressed, but I feel an ongoing helplessness and disorientation. I have nightmares in which I relive what happened .”

A collection of writings by activists in the group appeared in 2013.

Political position 
Anarchists Against the Wall, along with Ta'ayush, main political support comes from Arab parties and the extreme left. It openly opposes the state and activists routinely break the law as  they consider the government's decision to be illegal according to international law and therefore illegitimate.

See also
 Israeli–Palestinian conflict
 Refusenik

References

Further reading

External links
 Anarchists Against the Wall - Official website

Non-governmental organizations involved in the Israeli–Palestinian conflict
Israeli West Bank barrier
Anarchist organizations in Israel
Direct action
Anarchist collectives
Jewish anarchism
Jewish anti-Zionism in Israel
Jewish anti-Zionist organizations